Radio Kiskeya is a radio station in Port-au-Prince, Haiti that broadcasts music, talk shows, sports, news, and cultural programs. Its news covers both Haiti and the international community, and its music spans on compas, jazz, tubes, and others.

See also
 Media of Haiti

External links
 Listen Online on ZenoLive

Radio stations in Haiti